Fathabad (also Romanized as Fatḩābād; also known as Kalāteh-ye Gorghā, Kalāteh Gorghā, and Kalāteh-ye Gorg hā Fatḩābād) is a village in Miyan Velayat Rural District, in the Central District of Mashhad County, Razavi Khorasan Province, Iran. At the 2006 census, its population was 81, in 18 families.

References 

Populated places in Mashhad County